Comovirinae is a subfamily of viruses in the order Picornavirales, in the family Secoviridae; its genera were formerly classified in the family Comoviridae. Plants serve as natural hosts. There are 62 species in this subfamily, assigned to 3 genera.

Taxonomy
The genera Comovirus, Nepovirus and Fabavirus were classified into the family Comoviridae in 1993.  This family was classified as part of the order Picornavirales when this order was created (2008), and its genera were reclassified as the subfamily Comovirinae of the family Secoviridae in 2009.

The subfamily contains the following genera:
 Comovirus
 Fabavirus
 Nepovirus

Structure
Viruses in Comovirinae are non-enveloped, with icosahedral geometries, and T=pseudo3 symmetry. The diameter is around 30 nm. Genome segments are encapsidated separately into two different types of particle similar in size. Genomes are linear and segmented, bipartite, around 24-7kb in length.

Life cycle
Viral replication is cytoplasmic. Entry into the host cell is achieved by penetration into the host cell. Replication follows the positive stranded RNA virus replication model. Positive stranded RNA virus transcription is the method of transcription. The virus exits the host cell by tubule-guided viral movement.
Plants serve as the natural host. Transmission routes are mechanical.

References

External links
 Viralzone: Comovirinae
 ICTV

 
Picornavirales
Secoviridae
Virus subfamilies